Ashleigh Spencer (born 23 October 1992) is an Australian basketball player who currently plays for the Bendigo Spirit in the Women's National Basketball League.

Professional career

College
Spencer played college basketball at Hannibal–LaGrange University in Hannibal, Missouri. Playing for the HLGU Trojans in the National Association of Intercollegiate Athletics (NAIA) as a member of the American Midwest Conference.

WNBL
Spencer returned home from college and began her professional career in 2015, for the Bendigo Spirit. Spencer has been re-signed for the 2016–17 season, her second consecutive season with the Spirit.

References

External links
Profile at WNBL

1992 births
Living people
Australian women's basketball players
Forwards (basketball)